The 2003 All-Ireland Senior Camogie Championship—known as the Foras na Gaeilge All-Ireland Senior Camogie Championship for sponsorship reasons—was the high point of the 2003 season. The championship was won by Tipperary who defeated Cork by a three-point margin in the final. The attendance was a then record of 16,183. Player of the Match was Eimear McDonnell, a niece of Cork football legend Billy Morgan. The championship and the final was a high point in a period of rapid growth in the popularity of the sport of camogie which quadrupled the average attendance at its finals in a ten-year period.

Semi-finals
In the semi-final Cork were 2-2 up after only seven minutes, thanks to fine goals from Fiona O'Driscoll and Orla O'Sullivan. “All Galway could do was look on” one reporter wrote as they trailed 0-0 to Cork's 3-6 at the break and lost by 25 points. Tipperary beat Limerick 18 points in the other semi-final. With six minutes of the half remaining, Tipperary were awarded a penalty which centre back Ciara Gaynor struck to the back of the net and it gave them a 2-8 to 0-7 half-time lead.

Final
Cork led 0-3 to 1-3 at half-time. Deirdre Hughes got an early second-half goal and Eimear McDonnell scored four points to put them into a six-point lead with 10 minutes remaining before a late Gemma O'Connor goal put a better appearance on the scoreboard. Goalkeeper Jovita Delaney made a vital block and clearance on a late free.

Final stages

References

External links

2003
2003
All-Ireland Senior Camogie Championship